Bartolo Valencia Ramos (born  1965) is a Colombian politician who has been the 9th Mayor of Buenaventura, Valle del Cauca, since elected in 2012. He was elected as part of the Partido Liberal Colombiano political campaign.  He served as a Member of the Buenaventura City Council as a member of the Liberal Party from 1998 until 2003.

References

1965 births
Living people
Colombian Liberal Party politicians
Mayors of places in Colombia